Eunice Millar (24 December 1927 – 1992) was a diver who competed for England.

Diving career
She represented England and won a silver medal in the 10 metres platform at the 1954 British Empire and Commonwealth Games in Vancouver, Canada.

Millar was a diving coach in the 1970s.

Personal life

Millar married Joseph (or Giuseppi) M. Grassi in 1961. She died in 1992 in Gainsborough.

References

1927 births
1992 deaths
English female divers
Commonwealth Games medallists in diving
Commonwealth Games silver medallists for England
Divers at the 1954 British Empire and Commonwealth Games
Medallists at the 1954 British Empire and Commonwealth Games